Faisel Al-Kharaa (born 5 December 1993) is a Saudi Arabian footballer who plays for Al-Sahel as a right back.

Career
Al-Kharaa started his career at hometown club Hajer. During the 2013–14 season, Al-Kharaa helped them achieve promotion to the Pro League. On 23 July 2015, Al-Kharaa joined Al-Ittihad on a five-year deal. On 19 August 2016, Al-Kharaa joined Al-Khaleej on loan. On 26 May 2017, Al-Kharaa joined Al-Taawoun on loan. On 31 October 2020, Al-Kharaa joined First Division side Al-Jeel. He left the club following their relegation to the Second Division in the 2021–22 season. On 9 June 2022, he joined Al-Sahel.

References

External links
 

Living people
1993 births
Saudi Arabian footballers
People from Al-Hasa
Association football fullbacks
Hajer FC players
Khaleej FC players
Ittihad FC players
Al-Taawoun FC players
Al Jeel Club players
Al-Sahel SC (Saudi Arabia) players
Saudi First Division League players
Saudi Professional League players
Saudi Arabia youth international footballers